The following is a list of Sites of Special Scientific Interest in the Berwickshire and Roxburgh Area of Search.  For other areas, see List of SSSIs by Area of Search.

 Abbey St Bathans Woodlands
 Adderstonlee Moss
 Alemoor West Loch and Meadow
 Allan Water Hillhead
 Ashkirk Loch
 Berwickshire Coast (Intertidal)
 Branxholme Easter Loch
 Branxholme Wester Loch
 Buckstruther Moss
 Burnmouth Coast
 Catshawhill
 Coldingham Common, Long Moss
 Coldingham Loch
 Cragbank and Wolfehopelee Woods
 Crook Burn Dyeshaugh
 Din Moss and Hoselaw Loch
 Drone Moss
 Foulden Burn
 Gordon Moss
 Greenlaw Moor
 Hareheugh Craigs
 Hummelknowes Moss
 Jedwater Woodlands
 Kershope Bridge
 Kielderhead Moors : Carter Fell to Peel Fell
 Kingside Loch
 Kippilaw Moss
 Kirkton Burn Meadow
 Lammer Law
 Langholm - Newcastleton Hills
 Langton Lees Cleugh
 Lennel, Charley's Brae
 Lintmill Railway Cutting
 Long Moss - Drinkstone Hill
 Longnewton Cutting
 Lurgie Loch
 Lynnwood - Whitlaw Wood, Slitrig
 Makerstoun - Corbie Craigs to Trows' Craigs
 Minto Craigs
 Old Cambus Quarry
 Oxendean Burn
 Palmers Hill Railway Cutting
 Pease Bay Coast
 Pease Bridge Glen
 Redden Bank Lime Works
 River Tweed
 Siccar Point
 Slaidhills Moss
 St Abbs Head to Fast Castle Head
 The Hirsel
 Whiteadder Water
 Whitlaw Bank to Hardies Hill
 Woodhead Moss
 Yetholm Loch

 
Berwickshire and Roxburgh